The Caetetus Ecological Station is a state-level ecological station (ESEC) in the state of São Paulo, Brazil. It protects one of the last remnants of the semi-deciduous forest that once covered the west of the state, and is home to a population of the highly endangered black lion tamarin.

Location

The Caetetus Ecological Station is divided between the municipalities of Alvinlândia (20.17%) and Gália (79.91%) in the state of São Paulo.
The ESEC is in the sandstone Marília Plateau region of the Western Plateau of São Paulo, formed by rocks of the Bauru group.
The land in this region slopes slightly to the west, with an undulating relief.

The ESEC is on the northern boundary of the Paranapanema basin.
It lies south of the Peixe River basin, and contains the sources of streams that feed the Paranapanema.
In the higher regions the streams form waterfalls. An escarpment cut by newly-formed valleys separates the upper plateau regions from the lower area where the Meio, Barreiro and Lagoa streams converge.
The Meio stream is a tributary of the São João River, which in turn is a tributary of the Turvo River, which feeds the Paranapanema.

History

The Gália State Reserve was created from part of the Fazenda Paraíso as a forest reserve on 9 August 1976 by decree 8.346 by Governor Paulo Egidio Martins, who declared the land to be of public utility, to be expropriated by the state treasury and to be used for research and preservation of natural reserves.
Governor André Franco Montoro transformed it into the Caetetus Ecological Station by decree 26.718 of 6 February 1987.
By law 9.264 of 19 December 1995 the name was changed to "Olavo Amaral Ferraz Ecological Station".

Environment

The Köppen climate classification is Cwa, mesothermic with dry winter, rains from October to March and periods of drought from April to September.

The ESEC contains a significant remnant of broad leaved forest.
Seasonal semi-deciduous forest once covered the western plateau of São Paulo, but only 6% survives.
The forests include the most valuable timber species exploited in the early 20th century, including the cedar, peroba, cabreúva, ipês, paumarfim, jequitibá, guarantã and amendoim, as well as many other less well known species.

The ESEC is home to the black lion tamarin (Leontopithecus chrysopygus), one of the world's most endangered primates.
After six years with no record of their presence, two adult black lion tamarins were discovered at the ESEC in August 2016 near the administrative headquarters.
Other medium and large mammals threatened with extinction or vulnerable in the region include the cougar (Puma concolor), ocelot (Leopardus pardalis) and oncilla (Leopardus tigrinus).
Vulnerable large animals, presumably threatened in the ESEC, include the collared peccary (Pecari tajacu), white-lipped peccary (Tayassu pecari) and South American tapir (Tapirus terrestris).
12 brown howler (Alouatta guariba) individuals were released in the ESEC in 1986, but this is too small a population to be viable.

A census of birds from October 2005 to December 2006 recorded 226. Another 68 species have been reported by other authors, making a total of 293 in the ESEC. Many were endemic to the Atlantic Forest of cerrado, and some were endangered in the state of São Paulo.
The blue-winged macaw (Primolius maracana) is considered vulnerable.

Visiting

The ESEC provides interpretation of nature and environmental education through the Paraiso Trail and the Cipó Trail, both of which have interpretive signs about the regional vegetation.
Students and organized groups make scheduled visits daily, with the aim of promoting environmental awareness.
The ESEC is supported by  IPE (Instituto de Pesquisas Ecológicas) and by the FNMA (Fundo Nacional do Meio Ambiente).

Notes

Sources

Ecological stations of Brazil
Protected areas established in 1976
1976 establishments in Brazil
Protected areas of São Paulo (state)